Baba Gobindas Temple is a Hindu temple in Gujarwas village, Mahendragarh district in the Indian state of Haryana. A mela is celebrated every year on Chaitra Dwadasi, three days before Holi Celebration.

Hindu temples in Haryana
Mahendragarh district